The  is one of nine active divisions of the Japan Ground Self-Defense Force. The division is subordinated to the Northern Army and is headquartered at Camp Asahikawa in Asahikawa, Hokkaidō. Its responsibility is the defense of North Western Hokkaidō.

The division was raised on 18 January 1962.

Organization 

 2nd Division, at Camp Asahikawa in Asahikawa
 2nd Division HQ, at Camp Asahikawa
 3rd Infantry Regimentnote 1 (Mechanized), at Camp Nayoro in Nayoro, with Type 96 Armored Personnel Carriers
 25th Infantry Regiment, at Camp Engaru in Engaru
 26th Infantry Regiment, at Camp Rumoi in Rumoi
 2nd Tank Regiment, at Camp Kamifurano in Kamifurano, with four squadrons employing a mix of Type 90 and Type 74 tanks and one Type 10 main battle tank squadron
 2nd Artillery Regiment (Mechanized), at Camp Asahikawa
 1st Artillery Battalion, with two batteries of Type 99 155mm Self-propelled Howitzers
 2nd Artillery Battalion, with two batteries of Type 99 155mm Self-propelled Howitzers
 3rd Artillery Battalion, with two batteries of Type 99 155mm Self-propelled Howitzers
 4th Artillery Battalion, with two batteries of Type 99 155mm Self-propelled Howitzers
 5th Artillery Battalion, with three batteries of Type 99 155mm Self-propelled Howitzers
 2nd Anti-Aircraft Artillery Battalion, at Camp Asahikawa, with three batteries employing a mix of Type 81 and Type 93 Surface-to-air missile Systems
 2nd Aviation Squadron, at Camp Asahikawa, flying UH-1J and OH-6D Helicopters
 2nd Engineer Battalion (Combat), at Camp Asahikawa
 2nd Logistic Support Regiment, at Camp Asahikawa
 1st Maintenance Battalion
 2nd Maintenance Battalion
 Supply Company
 Medical Company
 Transport Company
 2nd Signal Battalion, at Camp Asahikawa
 2nd Reconnaissance Company, at Camp Nayoro, with Type 87 Armored Reconnaissance Vehicles
 2nd Anti-Tank Company, at Camp Kamifurano in Kamifurano
 2nd NBC-defense Company, at Camp Asahikawa
 2nd Band, at Camp Asahikawa

note 1: Infantry Regiments are roughly battalion strength, derived from the Pentomic structure that reorganized regiments from consisting of battalions to consisting of companies. Battalions in Japanese practice generally refer to smaller units composed of fewer companies or batteries, such as a 2-company divisional tank battalion as opposed to a 5-company tank regiment.

References

External links
 Homepage 2nd Division (Japanese)

Japan Ground Self-Defense Force Division
Military units and formations established in 1962